Riese  may refer to:
Project Riese, a German Nazi World War II economic project
Riese Pio X, a municipality in Italy
Adam Ries (1492–1559), German mathematician
Riese: Kingdom Falling (originally named Riese), an American science fiction-fantasy TV series filmed in Canada, which followed a web series
Riešė, a village in Lithuania
Didžioji Riešė, a village in Lithuania